The House of Zogu, or Zogolli during Ottoman times and until 1922, is an Albanian dynasty whose roots date back to the early 20th century. The family provided the first president and the short-lived modern Albanian Kingdom with its only monarch, Zog I of Albania (1928–1939).

History
The dynasty was founded by Zogu Pasha, who migrated to the region of Mat in north-central Albania during the early 13th century.

The most famous member of the dynasty is Zog I, who in 1928 selfproclaimed himself King of the Albanians and ruled until he was deposed by Victor Emmanuel III of Italy following the Italian invasion of 1939. Victor Emmanuel subsequently assumed the Albanian throne.

With the death in exile of King Zog in 1961, he was succeeded as claimant to the throne and head of the House of Zogu by his only son Leka, Crown Prince of Albania (born 1939), who was self-proclaimed King of the Albanians by the Albanian National Assembly in exile. Leka I remained head of the house and claimant to the throne until his death in 2011 when he was succeeded by his only son, Leka II.

Leka II has no sons and is the only living descendant of King Zog. The current heir presumptive to Prince Leka is Skënder Zogu, his first cousin once removed.

Situation 
Prince Leka II, the only living male descendant of King Zog I and the head of the royal house , has no sons. The current heir presumptive to Prince Leka is Skënder Zogu, his first-cousin once removed. :

 Xhemal Pasha Zogu (1860–1911)
 Xhelal Zogu (1881–1944)
 (1) Skënder Zogu (b. 1933)
 Virginie Alexandra Geraldine Zogu (b. 1963)
  (2) Mirgin Zogu (b. 1937)
 (3) Alexandre Zogu (b. 1963)
  (4) Michel Zogu (b. 1966)
   King Zog I (1895–1961)
  Crown Prince Leka I (1939–2011)
  Prince Leka II (born 1982)
  Princess Geraldine (born 2020)

See also
 Histoire de l'Albanie et de sa maison royale (5 volumes) - Najbor, Patrice -  JePublie - Paris - 2008

External links

Official website of the Albanian Royal Court
Site Officiel de la Maison Royale d'Albanie

Bibliography
 Patrice Najbor, Histoire de l'Albanie et de sa maison royale (5 volumes), JePublie, Paris, 2008,.
 Patrice Najbor, la dynastye des Zogu, Textes & Prétextes, Paris, 2002

References

 
Muslim dynasties